Charles Ferguson (1910–1995) was a Scottish footballer who played as an inside forward. Ferguson spent his pre-war years with Middlesbrough, Notts County and Luton Town, playing for Arbroath, Dumbarton and Aberdeen during the Second World War and Dundee United briefly after it. Moving to North Shields for work purposes, Ferguson went on to become a scout with Burnley and Sunderland.

Ferguson died in 1995 aged 84.

References

1995 deaths
Scottish footballers
English Football League players
Scottish Football League players
Middlesbrough F.C. players
Notts County F.C. players
Luton Town F.C. players
Arbroath F.C. players
Aberdeen F.C. players
Dumbarton F.C. wartime guest players
Dundee United F.C. wartime guest players
Sunderland A.F.C. non-playing staff
Scottish football managers
Gateshead A.F.C. managers
1910 births
Association football inside forwards
Footballers from Dunfermline
East Fife F.C. wartime guest players
Hamilton Academical F.C. wartime guest players
Raith Rovers F.C. wartime guest players
Greenock Morton F.C. wartime guest players